Disco is the fifteenth studio album by Australian singer-songwriter Kylie Minogue. It was released on 6 November 2020 by BMG Rights Management and through Minogue’s company, Darenote. Following the completion of her promotional activities with the Golden Tour in 2019, Minogue began working on a new album, enlisting producers such as Sky Adams, Teemu Brunila, and Biff Stannard, among others. Minogue continued work on the record from her home in London due to the COVID-19 pandemic in 2020, and received engineering credits for vocals and synths.

The album was stylistically influenced by various sounds of the disco genre, which was initially influenced through segments of her Golden Tour. Musically, Disco combines elements of nu-disco, funk, dance-pop, and pop music, and explores themes of love and intimacy, fun, unity, and celebration. She also received songwriting credits for each track on the album. Music critics praised Disco for its catchiness and upbeat nature, as well as her return to disco music. As a result of its critical success, it was included on various end-of-year lists published by various publications, and was nominated in categories at the 2021 Billboard Music Awards and 2021 ARIA Music Awards.

Disco was a commercial success, debuting at number one on record charts in her native Australia, the United Kingdom, Scotland, and Ireland. It was also in the top ten in Germany, Switzerland, France, Spain, and New Zealand. It was certified Gold by the British Phonographic Industry (BPI) for shipments of 100,000 units. Disco spawned three major singles to promote the album: "Say Something", "Magic", and "Real Groove", and three promotional singles: "I Love It", "Dance Floor Darling", and "Miss a Thing".

To promote the album, Minogue performed certain songs on a variety of televised and live shows. She hosted a live-streamed concert titled Infinite Disco, which resulted in the release of a live album. To wrap promotion, Disco was issued into two sub-releases: a re-issue with the subtitle Guest List Edition, which spawned three additional singles, and a remix album titled Disco: Extended Mixes.

Background and production
In April 2018, Kylie Minogue released her fourteenth studio album, Golden. It was her first record with BMG Rights Management and was inspired by country pop music. Despite its commercial success, it received lukewarm critical reception, owing primarily to Minogue's decision to experiment with country music. Minogue went on to promote the album with the Golden Tour in Europe and Australia in 2019. Minogue began early work on the album while on tour, but didn't have a concept from which to work. She became inspired by a segment on the tour that was loosely based on Studio 54, and disco aesthetic. Following her first few sessions, Minogue felt her creative direction was "heading straight back to the dance floor" with a disco-influenced album. Whilst promoting her greatest hits album Step Back in Time: The Definitive Collection, she confirmed her intention to release a "pop-disco" album following her performance at the Glastonbury Festival that same year.

Production began in the fall of 2019. She enlisted the help of long-time collaborators Sky Adams and Richard "Biff" Stannard, as well as new collaborators Duck Blackwell, Teemu Brunila, Linslee Campbell, Jon Green, Kiris Houston, Troy Miller, Nico Stadi, and PhD, to work on the album. Early sessions took place in her hometown of London, United Kingdom; she co-wrote every track on the album, making it her third effort to do so after Impossible Princess (1997) and Golden (2018). Due to the effects of the COVID-19 pandemic that occurred earlier that year, Minogue continued to record the album at her home studio in London for most of 2020. Because of this, Alistair Norbury, president of Minogue's record label BMG announced to industry title Music Week that the singer was learning to record and engineer her own vocals using Logic Pro to complete Disco. As a result, she was credited as engineer of each track apart from "Magic". Ninety per cent of the album was created via her home studio, with Minogue honing the album's theme of escapism during lockdown restrictions.

Composition
Disco stylistically references the aforementioned genre of the same name. During promotional activity for the album, Minogue told New Zealand radio host Zane Lowe that some of her influences for the album included Studio 54, as well as other musicians such as American disco musician Donna Summer and English singer and performer Elton John. Disco, according to Neil Z. Yeung of AllMusic, is a "welcome return to the club-friendly dance-pop that defined Australian diva Kylie Minogue's early 21st century rebirth." Yeung also likened the album to the works of Gloria Gaynor, Chic, and Summer. Robbin Murray of Clash felt it was "the sound of Kylie Minogue re-connecting with her roots." Sal Cinquemani of Slant Magazine noted the disco genre's influence on the year 2020, with other disco releases by musicians Róisín Murphy and Jessie Ware; Cinquemani stated that while the latter two take a "deep dive into the admittedly diverse genre", he felt Minogue's take on disco took more "superficial virtues."

The album begins with "Magic". It's been described as a "cheery" dance-oriented disco song with elements of pop music that could easily be compared to 1970s pop music. Its instrumentation includes horns, "funky" strings, "celebratory" handclaps, and staccato keys. Lyrically, it provides a hopeful message of a brighter future. Long-time collaborator Richard "Biff" Stannard co-wrote and co-produced the secord song "Miss a Thing", which is described as an uptempo disco number. Cinquemani compared the track's sound to Kylie Minogue's work on her albums Light Years (2000) and Fever (2001). Murray referred to it as "retro-futurism", and compared it to the work of French duo Daft Punk. "Real Groove" is a 1980s-influenced disco-pop song with house and R&B elements. Instrumentally, the song features additional keyboard instrumentation and Auto-Tune effects that has been compared to Dua Lipa's work on Future Nostalgia (2020). Critics cited the fourth track, "Monday Blues", as a notable departure from disco music and energy in favour of a fast-paced summery Tropicana pop sound with partying ambient background noises; because of this, reactions by publications for its inclusion on the record were ambivalent.

"Supernova", an energetic number with various "luscious" string arrangements, has been musically compared to the works of musicians the Bee Gees, Giorgio Moroder, and Boney M. "Say Something", the album's lead single and sixth track, was praised for being one of the best tracks on the album and in Minogue's discography. It is produced with various electronic and disco sounds that use "thick" synths, drum crashes, a funk guitar, and a choir. Minogue sings lines such as "Love is love / It never ends / Can we all be as one again?" Lyrically, it uses themes of unity and a quest for love. Katherine St. Asaph of Pitchfork described "Last Chance" as an homage to Summer's "Last Dance" and ABBA's "Voulez-Vous". It infuses pop music musically. The album's first promotional single, "I Love It", was described by DIY editor Lisa Wright as "perfectly-produced, shimmering Minogue 101."

"Where Does the DJ Go?" is the ninth track on Disco, and has been compared to Daft Punk's work on Random Access Memories (2013). In contrast to the other tracks on the album, it is noted for its "frantic" and "quick" pacing, record scratch sounds, and handclaps, while lyrically references Gloria Gaynor's song "I Will Survive". The tenth track, "Dance Floor Darling", is inspired by 1980s pop music. It begins with a mid-tempo beat with finger snaps, vocoders, and synths, and later transitions into a spoken word section before concluding with an uptempo beat near the end of the song. "Unstoppable", the eleventh track on the record, was co-written by Minogue, alongside Fiona Bevan and Troy Miller. The standard version of the album closes with "Celebrate You", a piano-led track that focuses mainly of Minogue's vocal deliveries and songwriting. Lyrically, it features theme of self-empowerment and the expression of sadness.

Release and promotion

Formats and artwork

Disco was released on 6 November 2020 by BMG Rights Management and through Minogue’s company, Darenote. Minogue and BMG publicised Disco with an extensive marketing campaign ahead of and during the album's launch. Minogue released a variety of formats on her website's store to promote the release of the album. The standard edition includes all twelve original tracks, while the deluxe edition includes four additional bonus tracks: "Till You Love Somebody", "Fine Wine", "Hey Lonely", and "Spotlight". Both editions were available in gatefold and jewelcase packaging. The deluxe edition content is included in a limited-edition media book version of the album, featuring a 20-page booklet with photographs and song lyrics and notes. On the same day, a digital version of the standard and deluxe editions were released.

A number of vinyl releases of Disco where also available including: in two different translucent colours (blue and turquoise), a clear transparent vinyl, and a double gatefold blue vinyl with the deluxe content. The standard black vinyl featured a bonus autograph photo of her. She also issued a limited number of white label vinyl editions of the album, each with a signed white cover sleeve by her. Furthermore, also issued were five cassette tapes with different artworks and cassette colours, one of which included an additional cassette tape with the deluxe content.

Simon Emmett, a long-time collaborator, shot the artwork and promotional photography for Disco. The cover artwork depicts Minogue with curly blonde hair, a blue sequin dress, and an lens flare in the middle of her hands, as well as her name and the album title in each top corner. Kate Moross provided creative direction, and Moross Studios created the designs. Moross Studios was also in charge of curating designs for all of Minogue's promotional merchandise, booklets, and packaging, as well as scenes and design work for her Infinite Disco tour.

Live performances

On 9 August 2020, Minogue made a promotional appearance on The Sound. On 16 September, she performed "Say Something" remotely on The Tonight Show Starring Jimmy Fallon. On 16 October, she was interviewed on UOL, then on Papel Pop the next day.
On 29 October, Minogue was interviewed on 7.30. On 1 November, the "Say Something" performance from the then-upcoming concert special 'Infinite Disco' was aired on The Sound. On 2 November, she was interviewed by Zane Lowe on Apple Music 1. To mark the release of the album, Minogue appeared on Sunrise, The Zoe Ball Breakfast Show, Good Morning America and The Graham Norton Show to discuss the album and perform songs on 6 November. She livestreamed a special concert, 'Infinite Disco', featuring songs from the album as well as previous songs from her discography, the latter reworked by Minogue's longtime collaborators Richard Stannard and Steve Anderson. The performance took place on 7 November 2020 and was co-directed by Rob Sinclair and Kate Moross, with the numbers choreographed by Ashley Wallen. A special also aired on Rage that same day.

On 10 November she gave an interview to Magic Radio's Breakfast Show, Reuters and made an appearance on The One Show. On 11 November, Minogue was interviewed on The Morning Show and ET Canada, and performed "Magic" on The Late Show with Stephen Colbert. The next day, she appeared on BBC Breakfast and This Morning. She was interviewed on Sunday Brunch on 15 November and on Lorraine on 17 November. On 19 November she appeared on El Hormiguero and on Skavlan the next day. On 27 November Minogue performed "Real Groove" and "Electricity" with Dua Lipa on her livestream concert Studio 2054. On 1 December, she was interviewed on Quotidien. On 5 December Minogue was interviewed on Graham Norton's Saturday Morning Show on BBC Radio 2 and performed "Real Groove" on The Jonathan Ross Show. She gave an interview to Les Enfants de la télé on 13 December. On 25 December, Minogue appeared on Lorraine and smoothfm. She gave an interview to Today on 29 December.

On 31 December, she livestreamed 'Infinite Disco' again and performed "Magic" on New Year's Eve Live and NBC's New Year's Eve. The latter appearance was a re-airing of the 'Infinite Disco' performance. Several months later on 4 June 2021, the 'Infinite Disco' performance of "Dance Floor Darling" was re-aired as part of iHeartRadio and P&G's 'Can't Cancel Pride' livestream event. On 25 September, "Dance Floor Darling" and "Can't Get You Out of My Head" were performed as part of Global Citizen Live. On 8 October, Minogue and Olly Alexander performed "A Second to Midnight" on The One Show. On 6 November, Minogue gave an interview to Later... with Jools Holland. On 13 November, Minogue and Ware performed "Kiss of Life" together for the first time on The Jonathan Ross Show.

Singles and other songs

"Say Something" was released as the lead single from the album. It premiered on 23 July at 08:30 BST on BBC Radio 2 during The Zoe Ball Breakfast Show. The song was acclaimed by music critics and peaked at number 56 on the UK Singles Chart. It also reached number nine on the UK Singles Downloads and Sales charts. In the United States, it debuted at number three on Billboards Dance/Electronic Digital Song Sales. The music video for the song was directed by Sophie Muller and filmed at the Black Island Studios in London, England, while adhering to social distancing measures due to the COVID-19 pandemic. It depicts the singer travelling through the universe mounted upon a golden horse sculpture, shooting lasers from her hands and flying on a hovercraft.

"Magic" debuted on The Zoe Ball Breakfast Show on 24 September and was released onto music services at 8am BST the same day, receiving positive reactions from music critics. The song was released as a single edit, while the album cut alongside "Say Something" appeared with the track on streaming services. It peaked at number 53 on the UK Singles Chart and number two on the Scottish Singles Chart. Also directed by Muller, the music video for "Magic" was filmed at Fabric, a nightclub in Farringdon, London. It features Minogue dressed as a druid with a magic staff dancing in the club alongside several dancers and then sitting on a throne wearing a gold medallion dress reminiscent of Cleopatra. According to Minogue, although Fabric was closed as a result of the COVID-19 pandemic, she wanted "to give fans a moment of escapism to celebrate on a fantasy dance floor."

"Real Groove" was confirmed by Minogue on BBC Radio 2 as the third single on 5 December 2020. The full performance of "Real Groove" from 'Infinite Disco' was already uploaded to Minogue's YouTube channel prior to this on 6 November 2020. The "Studio 2054 Remix" of the song featuring Dua Lipa was released to digital platforms on 31 December 2020. The remix featured updated production, handled by Lipa's musical director William Bowerman, as well as an extended instrumental section in the middle of the song.

Three promotional tracks were released from Disco. "I Love It" was released as a promotional single on 23 October 2020. On digital music platforms the track was released as an EP that also featured "Magic" and "Say Something". Two remixes of "Magic" were also included. "Dance Floor Darling" was added to BBC Radio 2's B-List from 24 April 2021. On Twitter, Minogue thanked BBC Radio 2 for adding the song to their playlist and interacted with fans. On TikTok, she re-posted multiple videos of fans using the song in their creations. Furthermore, video clips showing Minogue dancing along to the song in various outfits were posted on several platforms. Additionally, a remix subtitled "Linslee's Electric Slide remix" was included on the Guest List Edition of the album. The 'Infinite Disco' performance of the song was later made available on YouTube on 6 May 2022. On 22 July 2022, a music video for "Miss a Thing", directed by Sophie Muller, was uploaded to Minogue's YouTube channel, celebrating two years since the Disco era began and as a thank you to fans.

Guest List Edition and additional releases
In 2021, Minogue revealed that she was planning a re-release of Disco for later that year. On 5 October 2021, she announced the reissue, entitled Disco: Guest List Edition, which was released on 12 November 2021. The re-release included three additional tracks that served as singles: "A Second to Midnight" featuring Years & Years was released on 6 October 2021, "Kiss of Life" featuring Jessie Ware included an accompanying music video that premiered on YouTube on 4 November, and "Can't Stop Writing Songs About You" with Gloria Gaynor was promoted as the next single in March 2022. The song was proposed to Minogue during the original recording session for the album, but it was left off the track list. It was then recorded as a duet with Gaynor, after she had left a flattering comment on one of Kylie's social media pages. The official video featuring Minogue and Gaynor premiered on YouTube on 31 March. It peaked at number 74 on the UK Download Chart. 

BMG and Minogue's company, Darenote, released the Guest List Edition on 12 November 2021. The packaging includes previously unseen images from the Disco album, as well as a new album cover. Like the original Disco album, Minogue released a variety of formats of the re-issue on her website's store to promote the album's release. The double disc-standard edition contains all twelve original tracks as well as bonus tracks from the original, while the second disc contains three new singles and six new remixes. A five-disc limited-edition media book version of the album, featuring a 20-page booklet with photographs and song lyrics and notes of the new tracks, was released with audio and footage from Minogue's Infinite Disco tour. On the same day, a digital version of the standard and deluxe editions were released. A double gatefold vinyl re-issue included all songs from the original and new edition of Disco.

To accompany the re-release, Minogue and BMG remixed the album into extended mixes of each track, titled Disco: Extended Mix. The same day, a double gatefold vinyl with a holographic design of the original Disco artwork was released. It was part of an exclusive limited edition box set that came in a blue vinyl package and included the vinyl version of the Guest List Edition as well as a vinyl cover. Due to popular demand of the extended mixes, it was released digitally on 10 December that same year.

Critical reception

Disco received positive reviews from most music critics. At Metacritic, which assigns a normalised rating out of 100 to reviews from mainstream critics, the album has an average score of 72 based on 16 reviews, indicating "generally favourable reviews". Additionally, AnyDecentMusic? assigned a normalised rating of 7.2 out of 10, based on 22 reviews from music critics. In a positive review for NME, Nick Levine described the album as "a consistently uplifting set that feels like Minogue's best album since 2010's Aphrodite [...] Disco shimmers with a warm glittery glow that's just irresistible." Writing in The Guardian, Michael Cragg described Disco as being "saturated in Kylie's supernatural mix of high camp and total sincerity", while also praising the album for its "consistent sonic palette".

Some music critics praised the album's upbeat nature and production value, describing it as a hopeful sonic adventure during the latter half of the COVID-19 pandemic. Describing the album as "pure fantasia", Will Hodgkinson of The Times said: "the best thing about Disco, coming at a time when hopefulness has been at a premium, is how optimistic it sounds." Robin Murray of music title Clash called Disco "sheer escapism from start to finish, an exit point from the darkness that has fallen over 2020", while also complimenting the album's fusion of vintage and modern styles. Elisa Bray of i News called the album "pure euphoria", praising its production while describing its sound as "unabashedly retro [...] with a thoroughly modern sheen".

A few critics cited Disco amongst Minogue's best works. Neil Z. Yeung of AllMusic praised the album for reaching the same "highs" as her albums from the early 2000s and considered it a return to form following Golden. Arts critic Ben Neutze, writing for The Guardian on 17 November 2020, gave Disco a 4-out-of-5-star rating and commented: "It's a fitting album to rack up this milestone: a collection of songs exemplifying the cathartic joy that's been central to Kylie's brand since the beginning. It's music that makes you want to dance, and while the dance floors where many of her fans gather are currently off limits, it doesn't feel like a tease. Instead, it's a gift."

Despite positive feedback, minor criticism was levelled at Minogue's lack of an adventurous approach to the genre, which was perceived to be safe. Pitchfork contributor Katherine St. Asaph gave Disco 5.6 out of ten. In contrast to a few songs, Asaph felt the album had a "uncoolness" to it, and that the first half of the record was the "weakest". She stated, "The album, with a couple exceptions, has two modes: overly tasteful cruise-ship programming and gauche rehashes". Lisa Wright from DIY awarded it three-and-a-half stars out of five, stating that whilst Disco "might not be the most progressive or groundbreaking album of the year, it’s certainly up there as one of the most charming." Sal Cinquemani of Slant Magazine gave it the same rating, saying Minogue "has made a version of this album before," referring to Minogue's 2001 record Fever. He concluded, "For better or worse, though, Disco doesn't attempt to adapt the classic titular sound in a contemporary context like those albums did, instead content to bask in unapologetic homage. In the end, it's a sugar rush worth the hangover."

Accolades
Disco received nominations for music show awards and was included on year-end album lists. It received a nomination for Best Adult Contemporary Album at the 2021 ARIA Music Awards, her first nomination in that category since 2010's Aphrodite, as well as a nomination for Best Artist, her first nomination in that category. In the former, she was defeated by Crowded House's record Dreamers Are Waiting, and the Kid Laroi and Justin Bieber for their work in "Stay" in the latter category. Disco was also nominated as Top Dance/Electronic Album at the 2021 Billboard Music Awards, her first nomination through the association and its specific category. She lost to Chromatica by American singer Lady Gaga. Nordic magazine Gaffa shortlisted the album, and Minogue, in their categories Best International Solo Act and Best International Album, respectively. Additionally, Disco was submitted and shortlisted for Best Pop Vocal Album for the 64th Annual Grammy Awards, but did not received a nomination. Music Week awarded Disco the Digital Marketing Masters award, whilst Minogue and her label BMG were nominated for Artist Marketing Campaign, and Minogue and Murray Chalmers PR (MCPR) were nominated for best PR Campaign for the album, respectively.

The tables below show the nominations, wins, and year-end lists for Disco:

Year-end lists

Awards

Commercial performance

On 21 August 2020, the head of BMG, Alistair Norbury, gave an interview with Music Week about the marketing campaign for Disco. According to Norbury, Disco was outperforming her previous studio album Golden when compared with the same stage in its album campaign. This was according to key metrics such as streaming, Amazon pre-orders, D2C pre-orders and video views. In the United Kingdom, Disco debuted at number one on the Official Albums Chart on 13 November 2020, becoming her second consecutive number one studio album after Golden, and her sixth overall. Disco debuted 5,000 units ahead of its closest competitor, Confetti by Little Mix, in what several outlets deemed to be a hotly contested chart battle.

Disco overtook American singer-songwriter Lady Gaga's record Chromatica as the biggest opening week release of 2020, selling 54,905 units. This was quickly surpassed by Power Up by Australian band AC/DC, which sold 62,000 units in its first week. Disco became Minogue's eighth number one album in the UK and in the process, Minogue broke the record as the first female artist to earn a number one album in five consecutive decades, following Kylie (1988), Enjoy Yourself (1989), Greatest Hits (1992), Fever (2001), Aphrodite (2010), Golden (2018) and Step Back In Time: The Definitive Collection (2019). Within a month of its release, the album was certified silver by the British Phonographic Industry (BPI), and was later upgraded to Gold on 18 December 2020, having shipped over 100,000 units in the UK. To date, the album had sold 156,039 copies in the country.

In Minogue's native Australia, Disco debuted at number one, becoming her seventh chart topping on the ARIA Charts. It descended to number two the following week, and lasted eight non-consecutive weeks in the chart. After the re-release of the Guest List Edition, it re-entered the chart at number seven for a sole week. In New Zealand, the album opened at number nine on their national chart, Minogue's first top-ten entry since Fever in 2001. However, it only stayed in the chart for a sole week. In France, the album debuted at number eight, her highest charting position since Aphrodite peaked at number three. It quickly fell down the chart, and after re-entering at 45 during the promotional phase of the Guest List Edition, it fell off again the following week.

In the United States, Disco opened and peaked at number 26 on the Billboard 200 with 19,000 album-equivalent units, 15,000 of which were pure sales, becoming her third highest-charting album in the country after Fever in 2002 and Aphrodite in 2010. It also debuted at number two on the Billboard Top Albums Sales chart and atop the Dance/Electronic Albums chart, making it her first number-one on the chart. As of November 2021, Disco has sold 35,000 copies in the United States. It debuted at number 64 on the regional Oricon Albums Chart and number 65 on the Billboard Japan Hot Albums chart in Japan. It has reportedly sold 2,980 units in that country.

Track listing

Notes
  signifies an additional producer.
  signifies a vocal producer.
  signifies a remixer.
 "Magic" (Purple Disco Machine Extended remix) is omitted from the Guest List Edition digital album available on Minogue's webstore.
 The standard two disc release of the Guest List Edition places the four Disco deluxe edition tracks at the beginning of disc two, instead of at the end of disc one.

Personnel
Adapted from liner notes.

Musicians

Kylie Minogue – lead vocals (all tracks), backing vocals (tracks 1, 6, 11), synthesizer (track 5)
Felicity Adams – backing vocals (tracks 4, 9, 16)
Sky Adams – backing vocals (tracks 4–5, 9, 12, 16), guitar (tracks 4–5, 7, 9–10, 12, 14–15), synthesizer (tracks 4–5, 7, 9–10, 12–16), drums (tracks 4–5, 7, 9–10, 12–13, 16), drum programming (tracks 4, 7, 10, 12), programming (tracks 4–5, 7, 9–10, 12, 15), keyboards (tracks 13–15), bass (track 15)
Adetoun Anibi – backing vocals (track 6)
Fiona Bevan – backing vocals (track 11)
Duck Blackwell – keyboards (track 6, 8), bass (track 8), drums (track 8), percussion (track 8), programming (track 8)
Teemu Brunila – guitar (tracks 2–3), drum programming (tracks 2–3), keyboards (track 13)
Cherokee Campbell – synthesizer (track 5)
Linslee Campbell – bass (tracks 4, 7, 12–15), guitar (track 13)
Maegan Cottone – backing vocals (tracks 4, 7, 10, 12, 14–15)
Daniel Davidsen – guitar (track 1), drum programming (track 1)
Jon Green – backing vocals (track 6), keyboards (track 6)
Kiris Houston – bass (tracks 9, 16), guitar (track 9), strings (track 9), synthesizer (track 9), backing vocals (track 16), keyboards (track 16), synthesizer (track 16)
Ash Howes – programming (track 6)
Louis Lion – programming (track 6)
Troy Miller – backing vocals (track 11), bass guitar  (track 11), clavinet (track 11), guitar (track 11), percussion (track 11), drums (track 11), programming (track 11), Rhodes piano (track 11), synthesizer (track 11)
PhD – programming (track 1)
Johny Saarde – drum programming (track 1)
Danny Shah – backing vocals (tracks 12, 16)
Nico Stadi – guitar (tracks 2–3), bass (tracks 2–3), keyboards (tracks 2–3), strings (tracks 2–3), string arranger (tracks 2–3), drum programming (tracks 2–3)
Biff Stannard – backing vocals (track 6), keyboards (track 6), drums (track 8)
Thomas Totten – guitar (tracks 4, 10, 14–15)
Peter Wallevik – rhythm guitar (track 1), keyboards (track 1), drum programming (track 1)

Technical

Kylie Minogue – vocal engineer (all tracks excluding 1 & 16)
Sky Adams – engineer (tracks 4–5, 7, 9–10, 13–16)
Dick Beetham – engineer (tracks 1–15)
Duck Blackwell – engineer (track 8)
PhD – producer (track 1)
Teemu Brunila – engineer (tracks 2–3)
Daniel Davidsen – producer (track 1)
Guy Massey – engineer (tracks 4, 7, 9–15)
Troy Miller – engineer (track 11)
Alex Robinson – engineer (track 1)
Nico Stadi – engineer (tracks 2–3)
Biff Stannard – engineer (track 8)
Peter Wallevik – producer (track 1)

Recording studios

360 Mastering; Hastings, UK (all songs)
Biffco Studios; Brighton (track 6, 8)
Fluff!; London, UK (4)
Infinite Disco; London, UK (track 2, 3, 5, 7, 8, 10, 11, 13–15)
Metropolis Studios; London, UK (track 1)
Phrased Differently; London, UK (track 9, 12, 16)
Pulse Music; Silver Lake, Los Angeles, California (track 2, 3)
Rabbit Villa; Turku, Finland (track 2, 3, 13)
SARM Studios; London, UK (track 14, 15)
Spark Studio; London, UK (track 11)
Sky's Home Studio; Bedfordshire, UK (track 4, 5, 7, 10, 13)

Charts

Weekly charts

Year-end charts

Certifications

Release history

See also
 List of number-one albums of 2020 (Australia)
 List of Irish Independent Albums Chart number ones of 2020
 List of number-one albums of 2020 (Scotland)
 List of UK Albums Chart number ones of the 2020s
 List of UK top-ten albums in 2020
 List of Billboard number-one electronic albums of 2020

References
Notes

Citations

2020 albums
Albums recorded in a home studio
BMG Rights Management albums
Kylie Minogue albums
Dance-pop albums by Australian artists
Disco albums by Australian artists
Albums produced by Richard Stannard (songwriter)